Sivert Heggheim Mannsverk (born 8 May 2002) is a Norwegian footballer who plays as a midfielder for Norwegian club Molde.

Club career
In January 2021, Mannsverk was linked with moves to Aston Villa, Everton, Inter Milan and Bologna.

On 28 July 2021, Mannsverk signed for Molde on a contract until 2025. On 1 May 2022, he scored the winning goal in the 2022 Norwegian Football Cup Final against Bodø/Glimt.

International career
Mannsverk has represented Norway at youth international level from under-15 to under-21.

Career statistics

Club

Honours
Molde
 Eliteserien: 2022
 Norwegian Cup: 2021–22

Individual
Eliteserien Breakthrough of the Year: 2022

References

External links 
 Molde FK profile 

2002 births
Living people
People from Årdal
Norwegian footballers
Norway youth international footballers
Norway under-21 international footballers
Sogndal Fotball players
Molde FK players
Norwegian First Division players
Eliteserien players
Association football midfielders
Sportspeople from Vestland